Xerocrassa poecilodoma is a species of air-breathing land snail, a pulmonate gastropod mollusk in the family Geomitridae.

Distribution

This species is endemic to the island of Antikythira in Greece.

See also
List of non-marine molluscs of Greece

References

 Bank, R. A.; Neubert, E. (2017). Checklist of the land and freshwater Gastropoda of Europe. Last update: July 16th, 2017

External links
  Boettger, O. (1894). Die Binnenschnecken der griechischen Inseln Cerigo und Cerigotto. Nachrichtsblatt der Deutschen Malakozoologischen Gesellschaft. 26 (1/2): 1-12. Frankfurt am Main

poecilodoma
Molluscs of Europe
Endemic fauna of Greece
Gastropods described in 1894